The Exeter Township School District is a small suburban public school district located in Berks County, Pennsylvania. The District serves two municipalities southeast of Reading, the Borough of St. Lawrence, and Exeter Township. In 2009, the District residents’ per capita income was $24,836, while the median family income was $63,670. In the Commonwealth, the median family income was $49,501  and the United States median family income was $49,445, in 2010.

Schools
Jacksonwald Elementary School (K–4)
Lorane Elementary School (K–4)
Owatin Creek Elementary School (K–4)
Reiffton School (5–6)
Exeter Township Junior High School (7–8)
Exeter Township Senior High School (9–12)

Extracurriculars
The district offers a variety of clubs, activities and an extensive sports program.

Sports
The District funds:

Boys
Baseball - AAAA
Basketball- AAAA
Bowling - AAAA
Cross Country - AAA
Football - AAAAA
Golf - AAA
Lacrosse - AAAA
Soccer - AAA
Swimming and Diving - AAA
Tennis - AAA
Track and Field - AAA
Volleyball - AAA
Wrestling - AAA
Water Polo -

Girls
Basketball - AAAA
Bowling - AAAA
Cross Country - AAAA
Golf - AAA
Field Hockey - AAAA
Indoor Track and Field - AAAA
Lacrosse - AAAA
Soccer (Fall) - AAA
Softball - AAAA
Swimming and Diving - AAA
Girls' Tennis - AAA
Track and Field - AAA
Volleyball - AAA
Water Polo -

Junior High School Sports

Boys
Baseball
Basketball
Cross Country
Football
Indoor Track and Field
Lacrosse
Soccer
Swimming and Diving
Track and Field
Wrestling	

Girls
Basketball
Cross Country
Field Hockey
Indoor Track and Field
Lacrosse
Soccer
Softball 
Swimming and Diving
Track and Field
Volleyball

According to PIAA directory July 2012

References

 GreatSchools web site
 Standard and Poors School Matters web site

External links
 Exeter Township School District Homepage
 Exeter Community Education Foundation

School districts in Berks County, Pennsylvania